Kokmang is one of the 51 union councils of Abbottabad District in Khyber-Pakhtunkhwa province of Pakistan.

History
Most of the families living in Kukmang belong to Abbasi (Sararra, Dhund) and Qureshi clans.

Location 

Kukmang is located at 34°16'20N 73°25'30E and has an average elevation of 1208 metres (3966 feet). It is situated in the North East of the district, it borders Boi to the North . River Kunhar to its North East, Pattan Kalan to the East and Rankot to its West and Tandyani to its South West. To the east, beyond the Kunhar River, lies the fabulous snow-covered Pir Panjal mountain range of Kashmir.

Subdivisions
Kokmang Union Council is divided into the following areas:

 Kokmang
 Nakkar
Danna Masina 
Kanthiali

Weather
Kukmang features different climates due to its high altitude at one end e.g. from Haryala to Kukmar and low altitude at other end e.g. from Devli / Bandi to Palhair. The villages which are on higher altitude have cold and snowy winters, relatively cool summer with drastically escalated rain, in relation with lower altitudes, and frequent fog. The temperature can rise as high as 35 °C during the mid-summer in lower altitudes and drop below 0 °C during the winter months.

Notable people

Lt. Gen Sabir who served in Pakistan Army at various appointments and commanded one of Pakistan Army Corps. His Father Commander Retd Peer khan was

the first man from village how joined the Pakistan Navy. His younger Brother who is doctor left the Army on the rank of major name Shakir khan. Sardar walayat

was their uncle ex Nazim of kukmang. New Road constructed from Thandyani Rest House till Boi (Road Mahrahmat) is the contribution of Gen Sabir.

Brigadier Muhammad Ibrahim khan Son of Hajji Muhammad Azeem khan from Sair village joined Armored Corps Pakistan Army in 1979 and served on various

appointments. He Commanded One of the Armor Brigade of Pakistan Army. His two younger brother Lt Col Muhammad Haleem Khan and Major Muhammad

Naeem Khan is also Serving in Pakistan Army, which is the great honor for the Azeem's Family having 3 son in Pakistan Army.well known in the area.

Yasir Hameed from village Kukmar, Kukmang played for Pakistan Cricket Team at international level.

Muhammad Dilbar Abbasi (Late) was a renowned poet & reform thinker from Ledri village of Kokmang who wrote a Book named "Husn-E-Azal Darakhshaan". His

eldest son is Prof. Dr. Abdus Sattar Abbasi who is head of Center for Islamic Finance Comsats University Islamabad-Lahore Campus. He is PhD Managements

Scinces & Author of many Books. His Books are published by Oxford University Press as well. https://g.co/kgs/YZ5b1F. His 2nd Son Farooq Abbasi is renowned

businessman & an executive member of Rawalpindi Chamber of Commerce & Industry. His 3rd Son is Sabir Hussain Abbasi who is renowned real estate investor

& top level educationist. His 4th Son Shakir Hussain Abbasi is senior teacher in Roots Millennium School. His 5th Son in PhD Dr. Ummar Hayat Abbasi who is

currently in USA. His youngest son is Muhammad Bilal Azfar Abbasi who is a renowned social activist an well as media person.

Bashir Abbasi from village Sanja Director General KPK Agriculture Departments.

Muhammad Hanif Abbasi S/O Muhammad Yaqoob former Member Tehsil Council and leader of opposition in tehsil Abbottabad belongs to village Sanja.

Engineer Rafi U Din serving as Superintended Engineer in communication and works department kpk belongs to khanthiali.

Dr Muhammad Naeem S/O Muhammad Yaqoob Medical Specialist and senior consultant in Doha King Hamad Hospital Doha belongs to village Sanja.

Irshad Abbasi top level developmental consultant and organizer renowned country wide belongs to Nakkar village.

Bashir Abbasi highly qualified and renowned educationist of the Pakistan belongs to village Nakkar. Mr. Jameel Abbasi DG planning and development in federal government belongs to Nakkar village.

Muhammad Waqas Son of Muhammad Musa from Sair Gran Lecturer computer science Askaria college Rawalpindi .(Best teacher of Rawalpindi region 2016–17)

Major Muhammad Tahir s/o Muhammad Siddique ( Rially ) served Army for 30 years. His cousins Major Muhammad Tahir and Major Muhammad Kaleem are

serving in Army

Muhammad Naeem s/o Nasrullah jan (pathergali) serving as a superintendent jail police. His son Umair Naeem is also currently serving as a lieutenant in Pakistan

Navy. Muhammad Ishaq Abbasi r/o village Marhais is serving in supreme agency of the country.He served the nation with in the country as well as on different

assignment abroad.

Mr Muhammad Zareed Qureshi Advocate Supreme Court of Pakistan belong to village Kanthiali.

Engineer Muhammmad Akbar S/O Molvi Muhammad Yousaf S/O Gulam _e_ Haider S/O Allama Mufti e Azam( kokmang) Mian Muhammad Abdullah (R.A)

,.................., Hazrat Abdullah(R.Z) Bin Hazrat Abbas (R.Z), Served as SDO(E), WAPDA, Deputy Manager (E), SCCP Industries Pakistan, Principal Government Co

ollege Of Technology Abbottabad & Executive District officer (industries ) i.e EDO (indus..) District Abbottabad w.e.f. 18.10.1976 till 29.12.2012.

Sports 
Kukmang has a cricket stadium in the name of Late Sardar Walayat Khan with 48 teams forming a nursery of young cricketers.
kokmang is the union council where born international cricket player Yasir hameed .Yasir Hameed Qureshi is a former Pakistani cricketer, who played Tests and ODIs. He scored two centuries on his Test debut against Bangladesh, becoming only the second player to do so just after Lawrence Rowe. In February 2021, he began to undertake coaching courses with the Pakistan Cricket Board
.Last Test: 26 April 2010 v England
.Last ODI: 18 November 2007 v India

References

External links 
 Kukmang

Union councils of Abbottabad District

fr:Kukmang